The Ford Falcon (XT) is a full-size car that was produced by Ford Australia from 1968 to 1969. It was the second iteration of the second generation of the Falcon and also included the Ford Fairmont (XT)—the luxury-oriented version.

Introduction
The XT Falcon range was introduced in March 1968 as a facelifted version of the XR Falcon, which it replaced. The XT featured a revised grille and taillights and improved safety features including split-system brakes, larger tyres and electrically operated windscreen washers.

Standard equipment in the luxury Fairmont models included bucket seats, front disc brakes, a heater/demister, a wood-grain dash, carpet and courtesy lamps in all four doors. The Fairmont Wagon featured an electrically operated tailgate.

Model range 
The XT was offered in 4-door Sedan,  5-door Station Wagon, 2-door Utility and 2-door Van variants as follows.
 Falcon Sedan
 Falcon 500 Sedan
 Fairmont Sedan
 Falcon GT Sedan
 Falcon Wagon
 Falcon 500 Wagon
 Fairmont Wagon
 Falcon Utility
 Falcon 500 Utility
 Falcon Van

The luxury Fairmont models were not badged or marketed as Falcons.

The XT Falcon GT, which was introduced two months after the other models in May 1968, was the performance model in the range.

Engines
Four engines were offered in the XT range, all with increased capacity.
 3.1 L (188 CID) 114 bhp six-cylinder was standard on Falcon and Falcon 500 models
 3.6 L (221 CID) 135 bhp six-cylinder was standard on Fairmont models and optional on Falcon and Falcon 500
 5.0 L (302 CID) 210 bhp V8 was optional on Falcon, Falcon 500 and Fairmont
 5.0 L (302 CID) 230 bhp V8 was standard on Falcon GT

Engine capacity was now officially quoted in litres rather than cubic inches.

Production & replacement
After a production run of 79,290 vehicles the XT Falcon was replaced by the XW Falcon in June 1969. The XT name would be reused in 2002 on the entry-level model of the BA Falcon.

Motorsport

An XT Falcon GT driven by Bill Gates and Jim Bertram scored an outright victory in the 1969 Rothmans 12 Hour Classic race for production cars at Surfers Paradise International Raceway on 5 January 1969.

A team of three XT Falcon GTs won the Teams prize in the 1968 London-Sydney Marathon, finishing 3rd, 6th and 8th outright.

References

External links

XT
Cars of Australia
Cars introduced in 1968
Cars discontinued in 1969
XT Falcon
Sedans
Station wagons
Coupé utilities
Vans
Rear-wheel-drive vehicles
1960s cars